Rolf Solem (8 November 1917 – 13 February 2011) was a Norwegian jurist, urban district court judge and police chief.

He was born in Rjukan. He was urban district court judge in Porsgrunn/Skien from 1973, and chief of police of Oslo from 1974 to 1985.

References

1917 births
2011 deaths
Norwegian police chiefs
People from Rjukan